Skopun (pronounced) is a town in the Faroe Islands situated on the northern coast of Sandoy.

Skopun is the second-largest town on the island. Skopun Municipality consists only of the town of Skopun.

History
Although the area has been inhabited since the Middle Ages, Skopun was not founded until 1833. The people of Skopun did not possess any land. They subsisted on fishing, so the houses were built close to the water.

In 1897, Skopun's church was constructed out of timber taken from the old church of Vestmanna. The Faroe Islands' first road was built on Sandoy in 1917, as part of a government-financed plan to improve the island's non-existent harbour facilities. It connects Skopun with Sandur, the island's main town. Skopun's harbour was built in 1926 and later extended. In 1982, the harbour was furnished with a gate which protects the dock from the sea. A 1988 hurricane destroyed the town's small wood.

A car ferry used to connect Skopun with the capital, Tórshavn. Today, the ferry goes to the newly constructed port of Gamlarætt, located on the south-west coast of Streymoy.

People from Skopun 
 Peter Mohr Dam, prime minister
 Gerhard Lognberg, politician
 Niels Winther Poulsen, educator and politician
 Sakaris Stórá, film director

See also
 List of towns in the Faroe Islands
 Skopunarfjørður

Gallery

References

External links

Skopun, information and pictures on Faroe Islands.dk
Maps, airports, & weather on Skopun, Faeroe Islands Page

Municipalities of the Faroe Islands
Populated places in the Faroe Islands
Sandoy
Populated places established in 1833
Ports and harbours of the Faroe Islands
1833 establishments in the Danish colonial empire